I Love New York (stylized ) is a slogan, a logo, and a song that are the basis of an advertising campaign developed by the marketing firm of Wells, Rich, Greene under the directorship of Mary Wells Lawrence used since 1977 to promote tourism in the state of New York, including New York City. The trademarked logo, owned by the New York State Department of Economic Development, appears in souvenir shops and brochures throughout the state, some licensed, many not.

"I Love New York" is the official state slogan of New York.

The logo was designed by graphic designer Milton Glaser in 1976 in the back of a taxi and was drawn with red crayon on scrap paper. The original drawing is held in the Museum of Modern Art in Manhattan. The song was written by Steve Karmen and its copyright was donated by him to the state.

Logo
The logo consists of the capital letter I, followed by a red heart symbol (❤), below which are the capital letters N and Y, set in the rounded slab serif typeface American Typewriter.

In 1977, William S. Doyle, Deputy Commissioner of the New York State Department of Commerce hired advertising agency Wells Rich Greene to develop a marketing campaign for New York State. Doyle also recruited Milton Glaser, a productive graphic designer to work on the campaign and create a design based on Wells Rich Greene's advertising campaign. Glaser's initial sketch to accompany the agency's "I Love New York" slogan was conceived in a taxi. It comprised the letter I and a heart shape followed by NY, all on the same line. As the idea developed he decided to stack the I and heart shape on a line above the NY characters, later stating that he may have been "subliminally" influenced by Robert Indiana's LOVE pop art image.

Glaser expected the campaign to last only a couple months and did the work pro bono. The innovative pop-style icon became a major success and has continued to be sold for years. In the popular mind (though this was not the original intention) the logo has become closely associated with New York City, and the placement of the logo on plain white T-shirts readily sold in the city has widely circulated the appearance of the image, making it a commonly recognized symbol. Glaser's original concept sketch and presentation boards were donated by Doyle to the permanent collection of the Museum of Modern Art, New York.

The image became especially prominent following the September 11 attacks on the city, which created a sense of unity among the populace. Many visitors to the city following the attacks purchased and wore the shirts bearing the I Love New York logo as a sign of their support. Glaser created a modified version to commemorate the attacks, reading "I Love NY More Than Ever", with a little black spot on the heart symbolizing the World Trade Center site. The black spot approximates the site's location on lower Manhattan Island. The poster was printed in the New York Daily News and was a fundraiser for New York charities supporting those affected by the attacks. Added text at the bottom encouraged people to "Be generous. Your city needs you. This poster is not for sale."

New York state anthem

"I Love New York" was written and composed by Steve Karmen in 1977 as part of the advertising campaign. In 1980, Governor Hugh Carey declared it as New York's state anthem, although not officially enacted into law. In a move that was remarkable for Karmen, who is well known for retaining the publishing rights to his songs, he gave the rights to the song to the state for free.

Karmen wrote a new verse for the song in 2020 during the height of the COVID-19 pandemic in New York City to emphasize the city's resilience.  However, it was never commercially recorded nor used.

Imitations
 The logo has become a pop-culture icon, inspiring imitations in every corner of the globe. Merchandise proclaiming "I ❤ ..." can be found wherever tourists gather. Parodies, such as "I ♠  My Pets" or "I ♣  Seals", have also appeared. Facetious expressions beginning "I heart…", are based on a literal reading of the logo (e.g., the 2004 Independent film I Heart Huckabees and the audio conglomerate iHeartMedia). NYS-licensed pin-back buttons with a red version of the Apple logo replacing the heart (I  NY) were distributed at the 2001 Macworld Expo in New York.

New York has repeatedly attempted to uphold its trademark; by 2005, the state had filed nearly 3,000 objections against imitators, and 100 "trademark objections and cease-and-desist letters" were filed in 2012 alone. Some objections have been ruled void, such as when a court concluded in 1980 that the producers of Saturday Night Live did not infringe on the copyrights of the “I Love New York” campaign with its “I Love Sodom” skit, ruling instead that it was a parody.

See also
 Friday the 13th Part VIII: Jason Takes Manhattanhorror film criticized for using the "I Love New York" logo
 Heart in Oregon
 I Love L.A.
 I Love New York 355 at The Glen
 Tourism in New York City

References

Further reading

External links

 
 The History of New York's Marketing Campaigns, from the Gotham Gazette
 The Museum of Modern Art Collection Browser
 The Museum of Modern Art Collection Browser

1977 neologisms
American advertising slogans
American logos
Symbols of New York (state)
Songs about New York (state)
Tourism in New York (state)
Cultural history of New York City
Jingles
Symbols introduced in 1977
Tourism campaigns
1977 establishments in New York (state)
Heart symbols